Stranger is the third studio album by Japanese singer-songwriter and Sakerock frontman Gen Hoshino. It was released on 1 May 2013 in Japan on Speedstar Records.

It was the first release since Hoshino's hiatus after he suffered subarachnoid hemorrhage at the end of 2012. As of May 2013, it is ranked 2nd on the Oricon music charts. All three singles promoting the album reached the top 10 — "Film" placed at #4, "Yume no Soto e" at #8 and "Shiranai" at #5.

Track listing

Charts and sales

Weekly charts

Year-end charts

Sales and certifications

References

External links
 Speedstar Records

2013 albums
Gen Hoshino albums